The 1975 Rutgers Scarlet Knights football team represented Rutgers University in the 1975 NCAA Division I football season. In their third season under head coach Frank R. Burns, the Scarlet Knights compiled a 9–2 record while competing as an independent and outscored their opponents 347 to 91. The team's statistical leaders included Jeff Rebholz with 715 passing yards, Curt Edwards with 1,157 rushing yards, and Mark Twitty with 544 receiving yards.

The Scarlet Knights played their home games at Rutgers Stadium in Piscataway, New Jersey, across the river from the university's main campus in New Brunswick, New Jersey.

Schedule

References

Rutgers
Rutgers Scarlet Knights football seasons
Rutgers Scarlet Knights football